The Tokamak de Fontenay-aux-Roses (TFR) was the first French tokamak, built in a research centre of the French Atomic Energy Commission (CEA) in Fontenay-aux-Roses, a commune in the southwestern suburbs of Paris, France. Roughly the same size as the contemporary Soviet T-3 and American Symmetrical Tokamak, but had a larger internal plasma volume and a much more powerful power supply that drove plasma currents up to 400,000 Amps for as long as half a second. Completed in 1973, it remained the world's most powerful tokamak until 1976 when it was surpassed by the Princeton Large Torus.

Among the major discoveries made on TFR was the concept of "disruptions", potentially damaging events that eject the plasma from the center and lead to an event known as "runaway electrons". In 1975, such an event burned holes through the vacuum vessel, requiring extensive repairs.

It was followed by Tore Supra at Cadarache.

References

External links
 CEA official website (in English)
 CEA page about the history of fusion research (in French)

Tokamaks
Laboratories in France